Lisa Daniels may refer to:

 Lisa Daniels (actress) (1930–2010), British actress
 Lisa Daniels (synchronised swimmer) (born 1985), New Zealand synchronised swimmer
 Lisa Daniels (TV presenter), American television correspondent for NBC News